Tatkon is a town in Tatkon Township, Naypyidaw Union Territory, central Myanmar.

External links
Satellite map at Maplandia.com

Populated places in Mandalay Region
Township capitals of Myanmar